Sugar Transporter was the name of two steamships operated by Silvertown Services Ltd.

Ship names